Lee Hanee (born March 2, 1983), also known as Honey Lee, is a South Korean actress, model, classical musician as well as beauty pageant titleholder where she represented her country at Miss Universe 2007. She has acted in several films and television series.

Early life
Lee Hanee is the middle child of three, and has an older sister and a younger brother. Her father Lee Sang-eob was a high-ranking official with the National Intelligence Service. Her mother Moon Jae-suk has a PhD in Korean music history and is a professor at Ewha Womans University as well as music director of Gimhae City Gayageum Orchestra. Her sister is Lee Seul-gi, a member of the KBS Orchestra of Traditional Korean Music. Lee's maternal uncle is politician Moon Hee-sang (currently Speaker of the National Assembly).

Lee graduated from Seoul National University with high honors in traditional Korean music. She received her master's degree from the same university.

Career

Beauty pageant
Lee won the 2006 Miss Korea pageant and represented South Korea in the Miss Universe 2007. She managed to break into the Top 5 and was placed 3rd runner-up; Riyo Mori from Japan was crowned Miss Universe that year. Lee was also named Miss Grand Slam 2007.

Music
Lee is a professional gayageum player, a Korean music instrument. She was named a gayageum prodigy by the Kumho Art Center, the most prestigious musical foundation in Korea. She has released four CDs and played in more than 25 countries, including concerts at Carnegie Hall in New York City. In 2017, she participated in the largest-ever mass performance of the gayageum as part of the two-day Uijeongbu International Gayageum Festival.

Lee performed at the closing ceremony of the 2018 Winter Olympics, where she reinterpreted '춘앵무(Chunaengmu)', one of the royal dances of the Joseon dynasty.

Lee appeared in the music video For Dynamic Duo (South Korean duo)'s song "Jam". Presumably Lee plays a Honeybee in the video which is a pun on the honeybee themed video.

Film and television
Lee Hanee co-hosted Real Time TV Entertainment, on the national TV network SBS, a 12-year-old show focusing on show business, beginning July 18.

In 2008, she made her acting debut in the musical Polaroid which opened at PMC Daehangno Jayu Theater in Hyehwa-dong, Jongno-gu. She has since starred in musicals Legally Blonde, playing Elle Woods and Chicago, playing Roxie Hart.

In 2009, Lee starred in her first television series The Partner, playing a femme fatale attorney. She next starred in the romantic comedy series Pasta (2010), playing a celebrity chef.

Lee won her first acting accolade at the MBC Drama Awards, the Best Newcomer award for her performance in the family drama Iron Daughters-in-law (2011).

In 2011, Lee was cast in her first big screen role in action film, Hit. She also featured in the disaster film Deranged and period comedy I Am a King (2012).

After appearing in E J-yong's ensemble mockumentary Behind the Camera (2013), Lee starred in the gambling film Tazza: The Hidden Card (2014), playing a rich widow.

She also appeared in a comedy drama in 2014 called Modern Farmer which is about a rock band called "Excellent Souls." The band consists of Lee Min-Ki (Lee Hong-Ki), Kang Hyeok (Park Min-Woo), Yoo Han-Cheol (Lee Si-Un) and Han Ki-Joon (Kwak Dong-Yeon). The band decides to move to the countryside. The drama series follows their dreams, loves, and friendships.

Lee then played Queen Daemok in the 2015 historical drama Shine or Go Crazy, which depicts a fictional romance between a cursed Goryeo prince and the last princess of Balhae. The same year, she starred in the science fiction film Sori: Voice From The Heart.

In 2016, Lee starred in the comedy drama Please Come Back, Mister. Lee was praised for her chemistry with co-star Oh Yeon-seo, whom she has acted with in her previous project Shine or Go Crazy.

In 2017, Lee played famous gisaeng Jang Nok-su in the historical drama The Rebel. She won critical praise for her portrayal, and won several acting awards. The same year, she featured in crime thriller Heart Blackened and action comedy film The Bros.

In 2019, Lee starred in the comedy film Extreme Job as a narcotics detective. The film became the second-most successful Korean film ever with 16 million tickets sold. The same year, she starred in comedy crime drama The Fiery Priest as a prosector. The drama was a commercial success with over 20% in ratings. Both projects proved Lee's versatility and contributed to her rise in popularity.

In 2021, Lee starred another SBS drama One the Woman with Lee Sang-yoon, Jin Seo-yeon and Lee Won-keun, making a small screen comeback in two years.  She played dual roles as Jo Yeon-joo, a smart but corrupted prosecutor (which is similar to her previous drama The Fiery Priest) and Kang Mi-na, an illegitimate daughter of a chaebol who is abused by her family and her husband's family. The drama was a hit with the last episode achieving 3.2 million viewers and a rating of 17.8%. For her successful portrayal of dual character with polar opposite personality, she earned a top excellence award and daesang nomination at 2021 SBS Drama Awards.

Personal life
Lee has been actively involved in voluntary work for several organizations such as UNICEF, Compassion and World Vision. She serves as the Goodwill Ambassador for Beauty Mind Charity and Korea Green Foundation.

Lee holds a third degree black belt in Taekwondo, and is a scuba diver and a competitive skier.

She is of Christian faith and once followed a vegetarian diet. But she began eating meat and fish for her own freedom according to her.

Relationship and marriage 
On November 8, 2021, it was confirmed that Lee was dating a non-celebrity boyfriend. They have been dating since early 2021. On December 21, 2021, Saram Entertainment confirmed that Lee has married that day, and the wedding ceremony was held in Seoul where only family members attended. According to Lee’s agency, her husband is a Korean-American office worker.

In January 2022, Lee's agency announced that Lee was 4 months pregnant with her first child. On June 20, 2022, she gave birth to a daughter at a hospital in Seoul.

Filmography

Film

Television series

Television shows

Theater

Awards and nominations

State honors

Listicles

Notes

References

External links

 Lee Hanee at Saram Entertainment
 Lee Hanee at Miss Korea website

1983 births
Living people
People from Seoul
King Kong by Starship artists
Miss Korea winners
Miss Universe 2007 contestants
South Korean female models
South Korean television actresses
South Korean film actresses
South Korean musical theatre actresses
21st-century South Korean actresses
Seoul National University alumni
Ewha Womans University alumni